Frisoni is an Italian surname. Notable people with the surname include:

Donato Giuseppe Frisoni (1683–1785), Italian architect
Elisa Frisoni (born 1985), Italian cyclist
Enzo Frisoni (born 1947), Sammarinese cyclist
Evaristo Frisoni (born 1907), Italian footballer
Guido Frisoni (born 1970), Sammarinese cyclist
Luigi Frisoni (1760–1811), Italian painter

Italian-language surnames